Gurvanzagal (Three zagal) is a sum (district) of Dornod Province in eastern Mongolia. In 2009, its population was 1,338.

References 

Districts of Dornod Province